The 1836 Republic of Texas presidential election was the first such election in the newly established Republic of Texas. Popular war hero Samuel Houston was elected in a decisive victory over Henry Smith and Stephen F. Austin. Houston was inaugurated on October 22, 1836, replacing interim president David G. Burnet.

Candidates
 Stephen F. Austin, Texan Commissioner to the United States
 Samuel Houston, Commander-in-Chief of the Texian Army  
 Henry Smith, Governor of the Provisional Government

Campaign
Prior to Houston's entrance into the race, Stephen F. Austin considered himself to be the front-runner in the election to become the first president of Texas. His opponent in the race was Henry Smith, who had been governor of the Provisional Government and a delegate to the convention that declared the independence of the Republic of Texas. Others, however, had doubts about his qualifications. Austin was not widely known to most Texans, and his connections to land speculator Samuel May Williams had soiled his public reputation. When, eleven days before the election, Houston declared his candidacy, Austin's hopes of winning the presidency were sunk.

Results
Houston won the election in a landslide, carrying 77% of the vote to Smith's 13% and Austin's 10%. Mirabeau Lamar was elected vice president by a majority of 2,699 votes.

References

 

1836 elections in North America
Presidential
Non-partisan elections
1836
September 1836 events